Nancy McLain (born January 17, 1945) was a Republican member of the Arizona House of Representatives, representing Arizona Legislative District 3.  She served from January 2005 until January 2013.

References

Members of the Arizona House of Representatives
1945 births
Living people
21st-century American politicians
21st-century American women politicians